This is a list of authors from the Canadian province of Quebec.

A

José Acquelin
Donald Alarie
Francine Allard
Ginette Anfousse
François Réal Angers
Emmanuel Aquin
Hubert Aquin
Nelly Arcan
Gilles Archambault
Olivar Asselin
Bernard Assiniwi
Aude
Edem Awumey

B

Victor Barbeau
Robertine Barry
Yves Beauchemin
Honoré Beaugrand
Victor-Lévy Beaulieu
Saul Bellow
Christophe Bernard
Jovette Bernier
Louky Bersianik
Claudine Bertrand
Gérard Bessette
Lise Bissonnette
Neil Bissoondath
Marie-Claire Blais
Maxime Raymond Bock
France Boisvert
Paul-Émile Borduas
Jacques Brault
Lysette Brochu
Nicole Brossard
Chrystine Brouillet
Françoise Bujold

C

Pierre du Calvet
Lisa Carducci
Roch Carrier
George-Étienne Cartier
Henri-Raymond Casgrain
Catherine Chandler
William Chapman
Pierre Francois Xavier de Charlevoix
Pierre-Joseph-Olivier Chauveau
Ying Chen
Évelyne de la Chenelière
Adrienne Choquette
Leonard Cohen
Laure Conan
Arlette Cousture
Octave Crémazie
Ross Cuthbert

D

Jean-Marc Dalpé
Anne Dandurand
Diane-Monique Daviau
Claire Dé
Monique Deland
Esther Delisle
Dominique Demers
Denise Desautels
Jean-Paul Desbiens 
Louis-Antoine Dessaulles
Aurore Dessureault-Descôteaux
Ann Diamond
Nicolas Dickner
Hélène Dorion
Réjean Ducharme
Fernand Dumont
Louise Dupré
André Duval

E

Bernard Émond
Louis Émond

F

Trevor Ferguson
Jacques Ferron
Naomi Fontaine
Arlette Fortin
Louis-Honoré Fréchette
Christiane Frenette

G

Madeleine Gagnon
Mavis Gallant
François-Xavier Garneau
Hector de Saint-Denys Garneau
Phillipe-Ignace François Aubert du Gaspé
Philippe-Joseph Aubert de Gaspé
Claude Gauvreau
Gratien Gélinas
Karoline Georges
Antoine Gérin-Lajoie
Jean-Claude Germain
Jacques Godbout
David Gow
Alain Grandbois
Taras Grescoe
Lionel Groulx

H

Pauline Harvey
Anne Hébert
Louis Hémon
Claire Holden Rothman
Nicole Houde

J

Suzanne Jacob
 Roland-Benoît Jomphe
 Gilles Jobidon

L

Dany Laferrière
Michèle Lalonde
Claire de Lamirande
Serge Lamothe
Suzanne Lamy
Monique LaRue
Pierre de Sales Laterrière
Mona Latif-Ghattas
Félix Leclerc
Roger Lemelin
Robert Lepage
Rosanna Eleanor Leprohon
Samantha Leriche-Gionet
Pierre Leroux

M

Blanche Lucile Macdonell
Michèle Mailhot
Andrée Maillet
Antonine Maillet
Jovette Marchessault
Fleury Mesplet
Gaston Miron
Jeffrey Moore
Wajdi Mouawad

N

Émile Nelligan
Pierre Nepveu
Naim Kattan

O

Francine Ouellette
Madeleine Ouellette-Michalska
Hélène Ouvrard

P

Philippe Panneton
Alice Parizeau
Louise Penny
Bryan Perro
Joseph-Octave Plessis
Anique Poitras
Aline Poulin
Jacques Poulin
Yves Préfontaine
Monique Proulx

Q

Joseph Quesnel
Pascale Quiviger

R

Mordecai Richler
Louis Riel
Dominique Robert
Suzanne Robert
Esther Rochon
Adolphe-Basile Routhier
Maryse Rouy
André Roy
Gabrielle Roy

S

Félix-Antoine Savard
Marie Savard
Aki Shimazaki
Jaspreet Singh
Sonja Skarstedt
Gaétan Soucy
Olivier Sylvestre

T

Jules-Paul Tardivel
Ruth Taylor
France Théoret
Yves Thériault
Michaël Trahan
Clarisse Tremblay
Larry Tremblay
Lise Tremblay
Michel Tremblay
Roland Michel Tremblay
Marie-Rose Turcot
Élise Turcotte

U

Marie Uguay

V

Lise Vaillancourt
Pierre Vallières
Élisabeth Vonarburg

See also

 List of Quebecers
 List of Canadian writers
 List of Canadian women writers in French
 List of French Canadian writers from outside Quebec
 Francophone literature

References

Sources 

  L'ÎLE, le Centre de documentation virtuel sur la littérature québécoise – biographies and bibliographies of over 1000 Quebec authors

Quebec
Writers